OU Andromedae (also HR 9024) is a rotationally variable star in the constellation Andromeda. Varying between magnitudes 5.87 and 5.94, it has been classified as an FK Comae Berenices variable, but the classification is still uncertain. It has a spectral classification of G1IIIe, meaning that it is a giant star that shows emission lines in its spectrum. It is also likely in its horizontal branch phase of evolution.

In 1985, Jeffrey Hopkins et al. discovered that HR 9024 is a variable star, with a period of ~23.3 days. It was given the variable star designation OU Andromedae in 1986. Paola Testa et al. reported that the star showed X-ray flare activity, in 2007.

Fast rotation
The spin rate of OU Andromedae is unusually high for an evolved star of this type, showing a projected rotational velocity of 21.5 km/s. One possible explanation is that it may have engulfed a nearby giant planet, such as a hot Jupiter, since an infrared excess has been observed. Another explanation relies on its strong magnetic field; if OU Andromedae was an Ap star during its main sequence stage of evolution, it could have retained both the strong magnetic field and the fast rotation of Ap stars.

X-ray source
OU Andromedae is a bright X-ray source, due to the activity of its corona; it's estimated that solar-like active regions cover 30% of the surface. This is another effect of the strong magnetic field, which produces an uninterrupted flaring activity that generates a large volume of hot plasma at coronal temperatures (~7.5 K).

References

Andromeda (constellation)
223460
117503
9024
Andromeda, OU
G-type giants
FK Comae Berenices variables
Durchmusterung objects
Emission-line stars
Horizontal-branch stars